John Payntor (by 1482–1540), of Dover, Kent, was an English politician.

Life
Payntor married a woman named Joan; they had a son, Thomas, and a daughter, Joan.

Career
Payntor was Mayor of Dover in 1536. He was a Member of Parliament for Dover in 1539.

References

English MPs 1539–1540
Members of the Parliament of England for Dover
Mayors of Dover
Year of birth missing
15th-century births
1540 deaths